The English rock band Radiohead have received 22 awards from 79 nominations. They have received 16 Brit Awards nominations, and are the most nominated act in Mercury Prize history, with five nominations. They have received three Grammy Awards for Best Alternative Music Album, for OK Computer in 1998, Kid A in 2001 and In Rainbows in 2009. At the MTV Video Music Awards, Radiohead received the award for Best Art Direction for "There There" in 2003. They received the Q Award for Best Act in the World Today in 2001, 2002 and 2003. They were inducted into the Rock and Roll Hall of Fame in 2019.

AMFT Awards 
{| class="wikitable" style="width:85%;"
|-
! width=5%|Year
! style="width:40%;"| Category
! style="width:40%;"| Nominated work
! style="width:10%;"| Result
!width=5%|
|-
| rowspan=2|2016
| Best Rock Album
| A Moon Shaped Pool
| 
| rowspan=2|
|-
| Best Rock Duo/Group Performance
| "Daydreaming"
|

AIM Independent Music Awards 
The AIM Independent Music Awards, hosted by the Association of Independent Music (AIM), were established in 2011 to recognise artists signed to independent record labels in the United Kingdom. Most of the categories and nominations are selected by an independent judging panel, though some are decided by the public.

Antville Music Video Awards
The Antville Music Video Awards are online awards for the best music video and music video directors of the year. They were first awarded in 2005. Radiohead have received one award from two nominations.
{| class="wikitable" style="width:85%;"
|-
! width=5%|Year
! style="width:40%;"| Category
! style="width:40%;"| Nominated work
! style="width:10%;"| Result
!width=5%|
|-
| 2007
| Best Performance 
| "Jigsaw Falling Into Place"
| 
|-
| 2011
| Best Choreography 
| "Lotus Flower"
|

Brit Awards
The Brit Awards are the British Phonographic Industry's annual pop music awards. Radiohead failed to win all seventeen times they were nominated.
{| class="wikitable" style="width:85%;"
|-
! width=5%|Year
! style="width:40%;"| Category
! style="width:40%;"| Nominated work
! style="width:10%;"| Result
!width=5%|
|-
| 1994 || British Single of the Year || "Creep" ||  || 
|-
| rowspan="3" | 1996 || British Video of the Year || "Just" ||  || rowspan="3"|
|-
| British Album of the Year || The Bends || 
|-
|  rowspan="2" | British Group || rowspan="3" | Radiohead ||
|-
| rowspan="4" | 1998 ||  || rowspan="4"|
|-
| British Producer of the Year || 
|-
| British Album of the Year || OK Computer || 
|-
| British Single of the Year || "Paranoid Android" || 
|-
| 1999 || British Video of the Year || "No Surprises" ||  || 
|-
| rowspan="2" | 2001 || British Group || Radiohead ||  || rowspan="2"|
|-
| rowspan="2" | British Album of the Year || rowspan="2" | Kid A || 
|-
| rowspan="2" | 2002 ||  || rowspan="2"|
|-
| rowspan="3" | British Group || rowspan="3" | Radiohead || 
|-
| 2004 ||  || 
|-
| rowspan="2" | 2009 ||  || rowspan="2"|
|-
| British Album of the Year || In Rainbows || 
|-
| 2017 || British Group || Radiohead ||  || 
|-

GAFFA Awards

Denmark GAFFA Awards
Delivered since 1991, the GAFFA Awards are a Danish award that rewards popular music by the magazine of the same name.

Grammy Awards
The Grammy Award is awarded by the Recording Academy for outstanding achievement in the mainly English-language music industry. Radiohead have received three awards from 20 nominations.
{| class="wikitable" style="width:85%;"
|-
! width=5%|Year
! style="width:40%;"| Category
! style="width:40%;"| Nominated work
! style="width:10%;"| Result
!width=5%|
|-
| rowspan="2" | 1998 || Album of the Year || rowspan="2" | OK Computer ||  || rowspan="26"|
|-
| rowspan="2" | Best Alternative Music Album || 
|-
| 1999 || Airbag / How Am I Driving? || 
|-
| 2000 || Best Music Film || Meeting People Is Easy || 
|-
| rowspan="2" | 2001 || Album of the Year || rowspan="2" | Kid A || 
|-
| rowspan="3" | Best Alternative Music Album || 
|-
| 2002 || Amnesiac || 
|-
| rowspan="2" | 2004 || Hail to the Thief || 
|-
| rowspan="2" | Best Rock Performance by a Duo or Group with Vocal || "There There" || 
|-
| rowspan="5" | 2009 || rowspan="3" | "House of Cards" || 
|-
| Best Rock Song || 
|-
| Best Music Video || 
|-
| Album of the Year || rowspan="2" | In Rainbows || 
|-
| rowspan="2" | Best Alternative Music Album || 
|-
| rowspan="4" | 2012 || The King of Limbs || 
|-
| Best Rock Performance || rowspan="3" | "Lotus Flower" || 
|-
| Best Music Video || 
|-
| rowspan="2" | Best Rock Song || 
|-
| rowspan="2" | 2017 || "Burn the Witch" || 
|-
| Best Alternative Music Album || A Moon Shaped Pool || 
|-
| colspan="4" align="center" | Note
|-
| 2001 || Best Engineered Album, Non-Classical || Kid A || 
|-
| 2002 || Best Recording Package || Amnesiac || 
|-
| 2004 || Best Engineered Album, Non-Classical || Hail to the Thief || 
|-
| 2009 || rowspan="2"|Best Boxed or Special Limited Edition Package || In Rainbows || 
|-
| 2012 || The King of Limbs || 

 Aside from their work with Radiohead, members from the band have also received nominations at the Grammy Awards for their solo works, Thom Yorke has been nominated twice for Best Alternative Music Album, for The Eraser in 2007 and Anima in 2020, for the latter, he also was received nominations for Best Boxed or Special Limited Edition Package and Best Music Film. Jonny Greenwood was nominated for Best Score Soundtrack for Visual Media 2009 for the score of Paul Thomas Anderson's There Will Be Blood.
 Note: The table does not include nominations for others' work associated with Radiohead. 
 Nigel Godrich was received five nominations for Producer of the Year, Non-Classical for his work with Radiohead (2001, 2002, 2004. 2006 and 2009).
 Two albums have been nominated for Best Engineered Album, Non-Classical, Kid A in 2001 and Hail to the Thief in 2004, winning for Hail to the Thief. For Kid A, Nigel Godrich received the nomination as engineer; for Hail to the Thief, Godrich shared the award with Darrell Thorp.
 In 2002, the special limited edition of Amnesiac for Best Recording Package, the award was received by the art directors of the album, Stanley Donwood and Yorke.
 Two albums have been nominated for Best Boxed or Special Limited Edition Package, In Rainbows in 2009, which won, and The King of Limbs in 2012. For In Rainbows, art directors Stanley Donwood, Mel Maxwell and Xiaan Munro received the award, while for The King of Limbs, Donwood and Yorke received the nomination.

Ibiza Music Video Festival
Ibiza Music Video Festival is the online music video competition. Rupert Bryan and Elizabeth Fear founded the event in 2013.
{| class="wikitable" style="width:85%;"
|-
! width=5%|Year
! style="width:40%;"| Category
! style="width:40%;"| Nominated work
! style="width:10%;"| Result
!width=5%|
|-
| 2016
| Best Animation 
| "Burn the Witch"
| 
|

Ivor Novello Awards
The Ivor Novello Awards are presented annually in London by the British Academy of Composers and Songwriters. Radiohead have received four awards.
{| class="wikitable" style="width:85%;"
|-
! width=5%|Year
! style="width:40%;"| Category
! style="width:40%;"| Nominated work
! style="width:10%;"| Result
!width=5%|
|-
| rowspan="2" | 1998 || Best Contemporary Song || "Karma Police" ||  || 
|-
| Best Song Musically and Lyrically ||  "Paranoid Android" ||  ||
|-
| 2004 || International Achievement in Musical Theater || Radiohead ||  || 
|-
| 2008 || Album Award || In Rainbows ||  || 
|-

Libera Awards 
The Libera Awards, hosted by the American Association of Independent Music (A2IM) were established in 2012 to celebrate the achievements of artists signed to independent record labels

Mercury Prize
The Mercury Prize is an annual music prize awarded for the best album from the United Kingdom and Ireland. Radiohead have received five nominations, making them the most nominated act in Mercury Prize history.
{| class="wikitable" style="width:85%;"
|-
! width=5%|Year
! style="width:40%;"| Category
! style="width:40%;"| Nominated work
! style="width:10%;"| Result
!width=5%|
|-
| 1997 || rowspan="5" | Mercury Music Prize || OK Computer ||  || 
|-
| 2001 || Amnesiac ||  ||  
|-
| 2003 || Hail to the Thief ||  ||
|-
| 2008 || In Rainbows ||  || 
|-
| 2016 || A Moon Shaped Pool ||  ||

Meteor Music Awards
The Meteor Music Awards was an accolade bestowed upon professionals in the music industry in Ireland and further afield.
{| class="wikitable" style="width:85%;"
|-
! width=5%|Year
! style="width:40%;"| Category
! style="width:40%;"| Nominated work
! style="width:10%;"| Result
!width=5%|
|-
| 2004 || rowspan="2" | Best International Album || Hail to the Thief ||  ||
|-
| rowspan="2" | 2008 || In Rainbows ||  || rowspan="2"|
|-
| Best International Band || Radiohead ||

MTV

MTV Video Music Awards
The MTV Video Music Award is an award presented by the cable channel MTV to honor the best in the music video medium. Radiohead have received one award from 12 nominations.
{| class="wikitable" style="width:85%;"
|-
! width=5%|Year
! style="width:40%;"| Category
! style="width:40%;"| Nominated work
! style="width:10%;"| Result
!width=5%|
|-
|  || rowspan="2" | Breakthrough Video || "Just" || 
|-
| rowspan="2" |  || rowspan="2" | "Paranoid Android" || 
|-
| International Viewer's Choice Award for MTV Europe || 
|-
| rowspan="4" |  || Best Group Video || rowspan="4" | "Karma Police" || 
|-
| Best Alternative Video || 
|-
| Best Direction || 
|-
| Best Cinematography || 
|-
| rowspan="4" | 2003 || Best Visual Effects || rowspan="4" | "There There" ||  || rowspan="4"|
|-
| Best Art Direction || 
|-
| Best Editing || 
|-
| Best Cinematography || 
|-
|  || Best Video (That Should Have Won a Moonman) || "Karma Police" ||  || 
|-

MTV Europe Music Awards
The MTV Europe Music Award are an event presented by Viacom International Media Networks Europe which awards prizes to musicians and performers.
{| class="wikitable" style="width:85%;"
|-
! width=5%|Year
! style="width:40%;"| Category
! style="width:40%;"| Nominated work
! style="width:10%;"| Result
!width=5%|
|-
| rowspan="4" | 1997 || Best Video || "Paranoid Android" ||  || rowspan="4"|
|-
| Best Group || rowspan="5" | Radiohead || 
|-
| Best Alternative || 
|-
| Best Live Act || 
|-
| 2003 || Best Group || 
|-
| 2016 || Best Alternative ||  || 
|-

MTV Asia Awards
The MTV Asia Awards are the Asian version of the MTV Video Music Awards. Radiohead have received one award from three nominations.
{| class="wikitable" style="width:85%;"
|-
! width=5%|Year
! style="width:40%;"| Category
! style="width:40%;"| Nominated work
! style="width:10%;"| Result
!width=5%|
|-
| rowspan="2" | 2004 || Favorite Video || "There There" ||  || 
|-
| Favorite Rock Act || rowspan="2" | Radiohead ||  || 
|-
| 2008 || Innovation Award ||  || 
|-

MVPA Awards 
The Music Video Production Association (MVPA) is a non-profit trade organization created to address the mutual concerns of its members in today's highly competitive, ever-changing music video industry.
{| class="wikitable" style="width:85%;"
|-
! width=5%|Year
! style="width:40%;"| Category
! style="width:40%;"| Nominated work
! style="width:10%;"| Result
!width=5%|
|-
| 2002
| Best Alternative Video
| "Knives Out"
| 
| 
|-

NME Awards
The NME Awards is an annual Popular music awards show in the United Kingdom. Radiohead have won nine awards.
{| class="wikitable" style="width:85%;"
|-
! width=5%|Year
! style="width:40%;"| Category
! style="width:40%;"| Nominated work
! style="width:10%;"| Result
!width=5%|
|-
| 1994 || Best Single || "Creep" || 
|- 
| 1998 || Best Album || OK Computer ||  || 
|-
| 2001 || Best Band || Radiohead || 
|-
| 2002 || Best Video || "Pyramid Song" || 
|- 
| rowspan="3" | 2004 || Best Album || rowspan="2" | Hail to the Thief || 
|- 
| Best Album Artwork || 
|-
| Best Video || "There There" || 
|-
| 2008 || John Peel Award For Musical Innovation || Radiohead ||  || 
|- 
| 2010 || Best Band Blog || www.radiohead.com ||  || 
|-
| 2017 || rowspan="2"|Best Reissue || OK Computer OKNOTOK 1997 2017 ||  || 
|-
| 2022 || Kid A Mnesia ||  || 
|-

PLUG Independent Music Awards
The PLUG Independent Music Awards are given in support of indie music. Radiohead have received one award from two nominations
{| class="wikitable" style="width:85%;"
|-
! width=5%|Year
! style="width:40%;"| Category
! style="width:40%;"| Nominated work
! style="width:10%;"| Result
!width=5%|
|-
| rowspan="2" | 2008 || In Rainbows || Album of the Year || 
|-
| Radiohead || Artist of the Year||

Q Awards
The Q Awards are the UK's annual music awards run by the music magazine Q. Radiohead have received four awards from eleven nominations.
{| class="wikitable" style="width:85%;"
|-
! width=5%|Year
! style="width:40%;"| Category
! style="width:40%;"| Nominated work
! style="width:10%;"| Result
!width=5%|
|-
| rowspan="2" | 1997 || Best Album || OK Computer || 
|-
| Best Live Act || rowspan="5" | Radiohead || 
|-
| 1998 || rowspan="4" | Best Act in the World Today || 
|-
| 1999 || 
|-
| 2000 || 
|-
| rowspan="2" | 2001 || 
|-
| Best Album || Amnesiac || 
|-
| 2002 || rowspan="2" | Best Act in the World Today || rowspan="2" | Radiohead || 
|-
| rowspan="2" | 2003 || 
|-
| Best Album || Hail to the Thief || 
|-
| 2004 || Best Act in the World Today || rowspan="4" | Radiohead || 
|-
| 2011 || Greatest Act of the Last 25 Years || 
|-
| 2012 || rowspan="2" | Best Live Act || 
|-
| 2017 || 
|-

Rock and Roll Hall of Fame
The Rock and Roll Hall of Fame, is a museum and hall of fame located in Cleveland, Ohio, United States, dedicated to document the history of rock. Radiohead were inducted in 2019.
{| class="wikitable" style="width:85%;"
|-
! width=5%|Year
! style="width:40%;"| Category
! style="width:40%;"| Nominated work
! style="width:10%;"| Result
!width=5%|
|-
| 2019 || Radiohead || Inductee ||  ||

The Daily Californian Art Awards
{| class="wikitable" style="width:85%;"
|-
! width=5%|Year
! style="width:40%;"| Category
! style="width:40%;"| Nominated work
! style="width:10%;"| Result
!width=5%|
|-
| rowspan=2|2016
| Best Non-Billboard Song
| rowspan=2|"Daydreaming"
| 
| rowspan=2|
|-
| Best Music Video
|

UK Music Video Awards
The UK Music Video Awards is an annual award ceremony founded in 2008 to recognise creativity, technical excellence and innovation in music videos and moving images for music. Radiohead have received six nominations.
{| class="wikitable" style="width:85%;"
|-
! width=5%|Year
! style="width:40%;"| Category
! style="width:40%;"| Nominated work
! style="width:10%;"| Result
!width=5%|
|-
| 2008
| Best Rock Video 
| "House of Cards"
|  
| 
|-
| 2011
| Best Choreography
| "Lotus Flower"
|  
| 
|-
| rowspan="5" | 2016
| Best Video Artist
| Radiohead
| 
| rowspan="5"|
|-
| rowspan="2" | Best Alternative Video – UK
| "Daydreaming"
|  
|-
| rowspan="3" |"Burn the Witch"
|  
|-
| Best Production Design 
|  
|-
| Best Animation 
|  
|-
| 2022
| Best Rock Video - UK
| "If You Say the Word"
| 
| 
|-

References

External links
 Radiohead official website

Awards
Lists of awards received by British musician
Lists of awards received by musical group